Dirty Word is the second studio album by singer-songwriter's Ivan Neville's side-project Dumpstaphunk. It was released in July 2013 under Red Hot Records.

Track listing

References

2013 albums